The Case is a five-part British television legal drama series, written and created by David Allison, that broadcast over five consecutive days from 31 October 2011 on BBC One. The series stars Dean Andrews as Tony Powell, a defendant accused of the murder of his terminally ill partner Saskia Stanley (Caroline Langrishe), whose life Tony helped to end. Saskia's family suspect Tony may have an ulterior motive for helping Saskia end her life, but it falls to barrister Sol Ridley (Tristan Gemmill), defending his first murder case, to expose the truth.

Episodes were broadcast at 14:15 daily as part of the channel's daytime schedule. The Case remains David Allison's second and final original production for television, following his debut with the Sky Living series Bedlam earlier the same year.

Production
The series was filmed between Liverpool and Manchester. During production, Dean Andrews asked not to know the outcome of the final episode, instead choosing to "play the truth that was on the page at that moment", in order to prevent the resolution from influencing his performance.

Shortly prior to the broadcast of the first episode, the Radio Times published an article questioning if a story focusing on assisted suicide was suitable for daytime television. Actor Tristan Gemmill defended the programme, stating; “I had initial reservations about how you tackle such an emotive, delicate and topical issue in daytime, but what David [Allison] has done is walk through the minefield and create some fascinating, strong characters. Seeing the case from multiple angles really emphasises how the ripples affect everyone involved."

Cast
 Dean Andrews as Tony Powell; defendant 
 Caroline Langrishe as Saskia Stanley; victim
 Tristan Gemmill as Sol Ridley; defence barrister
 Chanel Cresswell as Julie Prior; pupil barrister
 Ruthie Henshall as Valerie Mornay; defence barrister
 John McArdle as Gordon McAllister; senior clerk
 Sean Chapman as Mark Metzler; prosecution barrister
 Connor McIntyre as Neil Stanley; Saskia's ex-husband
 Karl Davies as Dan Stanley; Saskia and Neil's son
 Michelle Tate	as Jess Stanley; Saskia and Neil's daughter
 Russell Dixon	as Judge Hopwood; presiding judge
 Dominic Carter as Karl Rankine
 Tupele Dorgu as Nicole Jones

Episodes

References

External links
 

2011 British television series debuts
2011 British television series endings
2010s British drama television series
2010s British television miniseries
BBC television dramas
English-language television shows
BBC Daytime television series